The Grinnell Pioneers football team represents Grinnell College in collegiate level football. The team competes in NCAA Division III as a member of the Midwest Conference.

History
On a blustery November afternoon in 1889, Grinnell College beat the University of Iowa 24–0 in the first intercollegiate football game west of the Mississippi River. The team's first head coach was Theron Lyman.  It was a member of the Missouri Valley Intercollegiate Athletic Association from 1918 to 1927 and its successor the Missouri Valley Conference	from 1928 to 1939.

After starting 2019 at 0–3 and with only 28 of 39 healthy players, the team withdrew from competitive play and forfeited its remaining seven games of the season on October 1 in order to protect the health and safety of its student-athletes. The players had voted overwhelmingly to end the season as a protest over their perceived lack of support by the administration, which the team believed caused them to be undermanned over the past four seasons.

References

 
American football teams established in 1889
1889 establishments in Iowa